The Aldrich Coal Mine Museum is a historical museum located in the former company store of Montevallo, Alabama. Aldrich was once a coal mining town, but is now a part of Montevallo. The museum contains historical photographs, artifacts, and displays from Aldrich's coal mine, churches, school, prison, stores, and post office. The only coal miner monument in Alabama is on display outside of the museum The museum is housed in the former Montevallo Mine Company commissary, containing the original sales counter and cash register, and documented by the Historic American Engineering Record as part of the Birmingham District. The Montevallo Coal Mine Company Store is listed on the Alabama Register of Landmarks and Heritage.

Gallery

References

External links
Aldrich Coal Mine Museum - Discover Shelby County

Museums in Shelby County, Alabama
Historic American Engineering Record in Alabama
History museums in Alabama
Mining museums in Alabama
Properties on the Alabama Register of Landmarks and Heritage
Company stores in the United States
Coal museums in the United States